The Iranian edible dormouse or Iranian fat dormouse (Glis persicus) is a species of dormouse native to Western and Central Asia. It is one of only two species in the genus Glis.

Taxonomy 
It was long considered conspecific with the European edible dormouse (G. glis) until a 2021 phylogenetic study supported it being a distinct species. The American Society of Mammalogists has accepted these results.

It is thought to have diverged from G. glis during a fragmentation of the ancestral Glis population (likely triggered by the Messinian salinity crisis) during the late Miocene, about 5.74 million years ago. Despite being restricted to a relatively small refugium on the southern coast of the Caspian Sea, it managed to persist in this refugium for millions of years, throughout all of the Pliocene and the glacial-interglacial dynamics of the Pleistocene.

Significant genetic divergence also occurs within this species; populations from eastern Iran and western Iran display a deep divergence of about 1.19 million years ago. This indicates that further splitting is likely within G. persicus.

Distribution 
It is restricted to the Caspian Hyrcanian mixed forests ecoregion, which served as a likely refugium for it during the original range fragmentation of Glis. It ranges from southernmost Azerbaijan to throughout most of Iran's Caspian Sea coast, and into Turkmenistan.

Description 
Most members of this species have a largely black tail, in contrast to the greyish tails of most of G. glis (aside from Italian populations, which also have blackish tails).

References 

Glis
Mammals of Azerbaijan
Fauna of Iran
Fauna of Turkmenistan
Mammals described in 1777
Taxa named by Johann Christian Polycarp Erxleben